Marc Weber (born 5 September 1997) is a German rower. He competed in the 2020 Summer Olympics.

References

1997 births
Living people
Sportspeople from Giessen
Rowers at the 2020 Summer Olympics
German male rowers
Olympic rowers of Germany